Portfolio investments are investments in the form of a group (portfolio) of assets, including transactions in equity, securities, such as common stock, and debt securities, such as banknotes, bonds, and debentures.

Portfolio investments are passive investments, as they do not entail active management or control of the issuing company. The foreign investors have a relatively short-term interest in the ownership of these passive investments such as bonds and stocks. Rather, the purpose of the investment is solely financial gain, in contrast to foreign direct investment (FDI), which allows an investor to exercise a certain degree of managerial control over a company. For international transactions, equity investments where the owner holds less than 10% of a company's shares are classified as portfolio investments. These transactions are also referred to as "portfolio flows" and are recorded in the financial account of a country's balance of payments.

They are categorized in two major parts: foreign institutional investment and investments by non-residents. According to the Institute of International Finances, portfolio flows arise through the transfer of ownership of securities from one country to another.

Portfolio investment covers a range of securities, such as stocks and bonds, as well as other types of investment vehicles. A diversified portfolio helps spread the risk of possible loss because of below-expectations performance of one or a few of them.

References

Investment